Johannes E. H. Andersen (September 29, 1888 – December 2, 1967) was a Norwegian long-distance runner.

He participated in the individual cross country competition at the 1912 Summer Olympics and finished 22nd. Together with his teammates Olaf Hovdenak and Parelius Finnerud he finished fourth in the team cross country competition.

References

1888 births
1967 deaths
Norwegian male long-distance runners
Athletes (track and field) at the 1912 Summer Olympics
Olympic athletes of Norway
Olympic cross country runners